Gonneville may refer to:

Places
Gonneville, Manche, a commune in the Manche département of France.
Gonneville-en-Auge, a commune in the Calvados département of France.
Gonneville-sur-Honfleur, a commune in the Calvados département of France.
Gonneville-sur-Mer, a commune in the Calvados département of France.

People
Binot Paulmier de Gonneville